Neshama is a Hebrew word which can mean "soul" or "spirit". It may refer to:

 Soul#Judaism the soul in Judaism
 Neshama Carlebach
 Neshamah (album), a CD by Tim Sparks.